Sør-Tverrfjord is a village in Loppa Municipality in Troms og Finnmark county, Norway. The village is located on the mainland of Loppa, along the Langfjorden, south of the island of Silda. The village is connected by road to the village of Sandland to the north, and it is connected to the rest of Norway by a ferry from Sør-Tverrfjord to the village of Bergsfjord and then onwards to the village of Øksfjord.

References

Villages in Finnmark
Loppa
Populated places of Arctic Norway